The 2022 General Tire 150 was the fifth stock car race of the 2022 ARCA Menards Series season, and the 12th iteration of the event. The race was held on Friday, May 27, 2022, in Concord, North Carolina at Charlotte Motor Speedway, a 1.5 mile (2.4 km) permanent oval-shaped racetrack. The race was contested over 100 laps. At race's end, Brandon Jones, driving for Joe Gibbs Racing, dominated during the end of the race, and earned his 6th career ARCA Menards Series win, and his first of the season. To fill out the podium, Corey Heim of Venturini Motorsports and Rajah Caruth of Rev Racing would finish second and third, respectively.

Background 
Charlotte Motor Speedway is a motorsport complex located in Concord, North Carolina,  outside Charlotte. The complex features a  quad oval track that hosts NASCAR racing including the prestigious Coca-Cola 600 on Memorial Day weekend, and the Bank of America Roval 400. The speedway was built in 1959 by Bruton Smith and is considered the home track for NASCAR with many race teams located in the Charlotte area. The track is owned and operated by Speedway Motorsports with Greg Walter as track president.

The  complex also features a state-of-the-art  drag racing strip, ZMAX Dragway. It is the only all-concrete, four-lane drag strip in the United States and hosts NHRA events. Alongside the drag strip is a state-of-the-art clay oval that hosts dirt racing including the World of Outlaws finals among other popular racing events.

Entry list 

 (R) denotes rookie driver

Practice/Qualifying 
Practice and qualifying will both be combined into one 45-minute session, with a driver's fastest time counting as their qualifying lap. It is scheduled to held on Friday, May 27, at 12:00 PM EST.

Race results

Standings after the race 

Drivers' Championship standings

Note: Only the first 10 positions are included for the driver standings.

References 

2022 ARCA Menards Series
NASCAR races at Charlotte Motor Speedway
General Tire 150 (Charlotte)
2022 in sports in North Carolina